The East Turkistan Government-in-Exile ( also known as the Government in Exile of the East Turkistan Republic; abbreviated ETGE) is a parliamentary-based exile government established and headquartered in Washington, D.C. by Uyghurs, Kazakhs, and other peoples from East Turkistan (Xinjiang). The ETGE claims to be the sole organ representing East Turkistan and its people on the international stage.

Although the East Turkistan Government-in-Exile was declared inside room HC-6 of the U.S. Capitol Building, the East Turkistan Government-in-Exile and the territory it claims under East Turkistan are unrecognized by the United States. The People's Republic of China has sternly opposed the East Turkistan Government in Exile since its creation in September 2004.

Positions 

Depending on how large a particular speaker defines the named region, "East Turkistan" has been administered at least in part by the People's Republic of China (PRC) as the Xinjiang Uyghur Autonomous Region, a situation that the ETGE considers an illegitimate military occupation. The position of the ETGE is that "East Turkistan and its people have a long history of independence". The ETGE does not consider themselves as "separatists" because they believe that, "you can't separate from something you don't belong to." The position of the PRC holds that the integration of Xinjiang into the PRC in 1949 was a "peaceful liberation", and that the region has "long been a part of China".

The ETGE describes itself as democratically elected parliamentary-based exile government that seeks to end "China's occupation and colonization" of East Turkistan, which overlaps with what China calls the Xinjiang Uyghur Autonomous Region, and seeks to "restore the independence of East Turkistan" which would take the form of a democratic parliamentary republic with protections for civil liberties for all people groups of the region. The ETGE has convened eight General Assemblies since its creation in 2004, 2006, 2008, 2009, 2011, 2013, 2015 and 2019. The organization itself is based primarily in Washington, D.C., where a large Uyghur diaspora lives, but has members in over a dozen countries.

Formation
The split of the East Turkistan National Center/Congress (ETNC) over the issue of independence versus autonomy in early 2004 led to the formation of the World Uyghur Congress which rejected independence in favor of autonomy and the East Turkistan Government in Exile which rejected autonomy and advocated for independence. The East Turkistan Government in Exile was formally declared on September 14, 2004, in room HC-6 of the United States Capitol in Washington, D.C. by members of the global East Turkistani community under the leadership of Anwar Yusuf Turani. Ahmat Igambardi, who had previously been the Chairman of the first East Turkistan National Congress created in 1992, was elected by the delegates present as president and Turani was elected as Prime Minister.

Leadership

Government leadership
As the Government in Exile is made up of a number of East Turkistan and Uyghur groups internationally, its leaders are based in a number of countries. The present leadership was announced on November 11, 2019 following elections at the ETGE's 8th General Assembly in Washington, D.C.

Parliamentary leadership
The Parliament is the legislative branch of the ETGE. As the Government in Exile's Parliament is made up of a number of members internationally, its leaders are based in a number of countries. The present leadership was announced on November 11, 2019 following elections at the ETGE's 8th General Assembly in Washington, D.C. The Parliament is also made up of six committees that help oversee the government's different ministries.

President
Ahmatjan Osman, a Uyghur poet, was the president of the group from November 2015 to October 2018, he was impeached for violating the ETGE's Constitution.

Ghulam Osman Yaghma, a Uyghur writer, poet, and veteran independence leader, was elected as the President of the ETGE during its 8th General Assembly.

Prime Minister
Salih Hudayar, the young Uyghur independence activist and founder of the East Turkistan National Awakening Movement was elected as the 4th Prime Minister of the ETGE on November 11, 2019 at the ETGE's 8th General Assembly in Washington, D.C.

Previous leadership

President 

 Ahmet Igemberdi (2004–2015; Australia)
 Ahmatjan Osman (2015 – October 2018, impeached; Canada)
 Ghulam Osman Yaghma (October 2018 – November 2019, acting; Canada)

Vice President 

 Hizirbek Gayretullah (2009–2019; Turkey)

Prime Minister

 Anwar Yusuf Turani (2004–2006, impeached; United States)
 Damiyan Rahmet (2006–2009; Australia)
 Ismail Cengiz (2009 – April 2019, impeached; Turkey)
 Abdulahat Nur (April 2019 – November 2019, acting; Canada)

Speaker of Parliament (Chairman) 

 Professor Sultan Mahmut Kashgari (2004–2015; Australia/Turkey)
 Koresh Atahan (2015–2019; Germany)

Activities
The ETGE engages in a wide range of awareness raising and advocacy campaigns about the human rights situation for Uyghurs, Kazakhs, Kyrgyz, and other Turkic peoples in East Turkistan. It explicitly advocates for the establishment of an independent East Turkistan concentrating on the United States Congress in Washington, the Canadian Government, EU member states, NATO, Japan, and India. In March 2020, members of the ETGE and the East Turkistani community, led by newly elected Prime Minister Salih Hudayar, met with Representative Ted Yoho and asked him to deliver a speech on East Turkistan at the US House of Representatives. Congressman Ted Yoho described East Turkistan as an "occupied country" and condemned China for its alleged genocide of Uyghurs, Kazakhs, Kyrgyz, and other Turkic peoples.

The ETGE aims to be non-partisan but has received more support on the East Turkistan issue from the Republican Party, and the Prime Minister makes semi-regular appearances on conservative media, including a guest appearance on Steve Bannon's War Room. In November 2019, retired U.S. Air Force Brigadier General Robert Spalding, the former Director of Strategic Planning, at the U.S. National Security Council and Joseph Bosco, the former China Director at the U.S. Department of Defense along with other American analysts had attended and gave speeches at the ETGE's 8th General Assembly in Washington, D.C.

In June 2020, the ETGE spearheaded an effort by pro-independence Uyghur, Manchu, and Tibetan groups to oppose "Chinese imperialism in all forms" and sent a joint letter to the U.S. State Department, the Council of the European Union, and the Foreign Ministries of India, Japan, and the UK rejecting "Chinese occupation," and calling on the "international community to help bring about a democratic resolution that gives complete national independence for East Turkistan, Manchuria, South Mongolia, and Tibet."

As reported below, on 6 July 2020 the East Turkistan Government in Exile and the East Turkistan National Awakening Movement launched an International Criminal Court (ICC) case against current and former Chinese officials of the People's Republic of China including Xi Jinping. The PRC, however, is not a signatory to the ICC.

The ETGE praised the passage of the Uyghur Human Rights Policy Act, a law that requires various US government agencies to report on human rights abuses in Xinjiang, and thanked United States President Donald Trump and the United States Congress. The ETGE stated that "we hope this will the first step towards restoring freedom and independence to East Turkistan.”

On July 14, 2020, the ETGE signed onto a joint letter by 64 Canadian MPs and 20 organizations urging Canadian Prime Minister Justin Trudeau, his deputy Chrystia Freeland and Global Affairs Minister François-Philippe Champagne to sanction PRC and Hong Kong officials “directly responsible for the human rights atrocities happening in Tibet, occupied East Turkestan (Xinjiang), and Hong Kong.”

On August 15, 2020, Salih Hudayar the Prime Minister of the ETGE greeted India on its 74th Independence Day and said that "the decades of prolonged Chinese occupation and genocide in East Turkistan has taught us that without independence there is no way to guarantee or ensure even our most basic human rights, freedoms, and our very survival." Prime Minister Hudayar urged Indians to cherish, defend and honor independence.

On August 28, 2020, the ETGE held a global demonstration in Adelaide, Tokyo, Frankfurt, The Hague, Paris, New York City, Washington, D.C., and Edmonton to protest what they claim are China's atrocities against Uyghurs and other Turkic peoples and urged the international community to recognize the alleged atrocities as a genocide while also recognizing "East Turkistan as an occupied country."

International Criminal Court case 

On July 6, 2020, the New York Times and The Wall Street Journal reported that the East Turkistan Government in Exile and the East Turkistan National Awakening Movement filed a complaint with the International Criminal Court, urging it to investigate and prosecute PRC officials for genocide and other crimes against humanity. The complaint is the first attempt to use an international legal forum to challenge China over allegations of extensive human rights abuses against Muslim Turkic people in East Turkistan. The 80-page complaint included a list of more than 30 senior PRC officials, including Chinese Communist Party general secretary Xi Jinping, whom the ETGE hold responsible. The next day, ETGE and the East Turkistan National Awakening Movement held an online press conference in Washington, D.C. and The Hague. The ETGE's Prime Minister, Salih Hudayar, told Radio Free Asia's Chinese service that "for too long we have been oppressed by China and its Communist Party and we have suffered so much that the genocide of our people can be no longer ignored."

On July 9, 2020, the US government sanctioned 3 senior PRC officials including Xinjiang Communist Party Secretary Chen Quanguo and Zhu Hailun, who were among the 30 officials mentioned in the complaint to the ICC. ETGE Prime Minister Salih Hudayar told Radio Free Asia that the ETGE welcomed the sanctions and that Uyghurs wanted real justice. He stated that the PRC officials should be tried for human rights abuses by an international court, citing the example the Nuremberg Trials of high-ranking Nazi Party officials after World War II.

Removal of "ETIM" from US Terror List 
The ETGE was the only Uyghur group to publicly advocate for the removal of the terrorist designation from the East Turkistan Islamic Movement (ETIM), which the ETGE believes to be fabricated by China to "falsely portray Uyghurs as terrorists." On September 11, 2020, the ETGE held a press conferencing denouncing the "ETIM" as a "Chinese fabrication" and claimed that the "greatest victims of terrorism in the 21st century are East Turkistan and its people." The ETGE however also denounced the Turkistan Islamic Party which it suspects of being created by Chinese intelligence in order to hijack the East Turkistan national movement and portray it as a "pan-islamic" movement. In October 2020, then U.S. Secretary of State, Mike Pompeo, gave a directive to delist the East Turkistan Islamic Movement from the United States Department of State list of Foreign Terrorist Organizations. The directive was published on November 5, 2020, and the State Department declared the decision was made because “for more than a decade, there has been no credible evidence that ETIM continues to exist.” The ETGE thanked the U.S. Government for removing the ETIM from its terror list and urged other countries to follow suit.

Recognition of China's human rights abuse as genocide 
The East Turkistan National Awakening Movement and the East Turkistan Government in Exile were the first Uyghur groups to refer to China's mass surveillance and internment of the inhabitants of Xinjiang/East Turkistan as a genocide. They have actively lobbied for the U.S. and other countries to declare the policies in Xinjiang as genocide. Over the years, the ETGE and ETNAM held numerous demonstrations, press conferences, and other events urging the world to recognize China's genocide in East Turkistan (Xinjiang). The East Turkistan National Awakening Movement and the East Turkistan Government in Exile filed a complaint urging the International Criminal Court to investigate and prosecute Chinese officials for genocide  and within months, the ETGE was able to persuade the Canadian Parliament to recognize China's atrocities as a genocide in October 2020, it thanked the Canadian Parliament for the genocide recognition and urged the Canadian Government to formally recognize it as well. The ETGE also successfully lobbied the U.S. Senate to introduce a genocide resolution and urged the U.S. Government to recognize the genocide.

On January 11, 2021, the ETGE made a press statement urging the Trump Administration to recognize China's atrocities against Uyghurs and other Turkic peoples in East Turkistan as a genocide before January 20, 2021. On January 19, 2021, the U.S. State Department formally designated China's atrocities against Uyghurs and other Turkic peoples as genocide. Salih Hudayar, the Prime Minister of the East Turkistan Government in Exile, told The Wall Street Journal that the ETGE had been pushing for the designation for two years and that the ETGE hopes that this designation will lead to real, strong actions to hold China accountable and bring an end to China's genocide.

The ETGE also called on the U.S. Justice Department to enact 18 U.S. Code Section 1091 and prosecute Chinese diplomats, specifically Chinese Ambassador Cui Tiankai, for genocide. The ETGE further urged countries to follow suit and recognize the genocide, it also urged the Biden Administration to "take a more active approach to resolve the East Turkistan issue" by recognizing East Turkistan as an Occupied Country, boycotting the 2022 Winter Olympics in Beijing and meeting with the East Turkistan Government in Exile like the Trump Administration met with the Tibetan Government in Exile.

Recognition of East Turkistan 
The East Turkistan Government in Exile has actively called on the U.S. and other governments and organizations across the globe to recognize East Turkistan as an Occupied Country. The ETGE also denounces the use of the Chinese term "Xinjiang" to refer the Uyghur and Turkic homeland of East Turkistan.

See also
Turkistan Islamic Party
East Turkestan independence movement
East Turkistan National Awakening Movement
First East Turkestan Republic
Second East Turkestan Republic
World Uyghur Congress

References

External links 
 Official website of the East Turkistan Government-in-Exile
 ETGE Twitter account

Independence movements
East Turkestan independence movement
National liberation movements
Governments in exile
2004 establishments in Washington, D.C.